The Württemberg T 3s were German steam locomotives with the Royal Württemberg State Railways (Königlich Württembergische Staats-Eisenbahnen) delivered between 1891 and 1913.

These tank locomotives were built for hauling goods trains and had three coupled axles but no carrying axles. All 110 examples went into the Deutsche Reichsbahn fleet where they were incorporated as DRG Class 89.3-4 in the numbering plan. By 1945 almost all of them had been retired or transferred to industry.

Three locomotives were rescued from the scrap yard, one of which is being presently restored to operational condition by the Railway Vehicle Preservation Society (Gesellschaft zur Erhaltung von Schienenfahrzeugen).

The Class T 3 L engines of the Royal Württemberg State Railways were also 0-6-0 tank locomotives and intended for goods train duties. Four examples were built, of which one survived into the Deutsche Reichsbahn fleet and was numbered as 89 411 within Class 89.3-4 of the DRG renumbering plan.

These four 'specials' had a steerable axle and were somewhat longer than the other Württemberg T 3s. They were deployed on the lines from Schiltach to Schramberg and from Waldenburg to Künzelsau, but proved to have very high maintenance costs, with the result that three of them were retired by the Württemberg State Railways. The remaining one was taken over by the Reichsbahn, but was soon taken out of service as well.

See also
Royal Württemberg State Railways
List of Württemberg locomotives and railbuses

References

Railway locomotives introduced in 1891
0-6-0T locomotives
T 3
Esslingen locomotives
Krauss locomotives
Standard gauge locomotives of Germany
C n2t locomotives
Freight locomotives